Saint-Germain-le-Rocheux is a commune in the Côte-d'Or department in eastern France.

History

Before the Roman Empire, Saint-Germain-le-Rocheux was populated by Celtic polytheists. A Roman temple was built on top of an Iron Age Celtic sacred site.

Population

See also
Communes of the Côte-d'Or department

References

Communes of Côte-d'Or